Schily is a surname. Notable people with the surname include:

 Jenny Schily (born 1967), German actress
 Konrad Schily (born 1937), German neurologist and politician
 Otto Schily (born 1932), German politician

See also
 Schill